Howrah–Jaynagar Fast Passenger is a Passenger train belonging to Eastern Railway zone that runs between  and . It is currently being operated with 53041/53042 train numbers on a daily basis. The train is also known as Dhuliyan Passenger.

Average speed and frequency 

The 53041/Howrah–Jaynagar Fast Passenger runs with an average speed of 24 km/h and completes 720 km in 30h. The 53042/Jaynagar–Howrah Fast Passenger runs with an average speed of 26 km/h and completes 720 km in 27h 35m

Route and halts 

The important halts of the train are:

Coach composite 

The train has standard ICF rakes with max speed of 110 kmph. The train consists of 11 coaches:

 9 General Unreserved
 2 Seating cum Luggage Rake

Traction

Both trains are hauled by an Asansol Loco Shed-based WAG-5 or Santragachhi-based WAP-4 electric locomotive from Howrah to Jaynagar and vice versa.

Rake sharing 

The train shares its rake with 53043/53044 Howrah–Rajgir Fast Passenger.

See also 

 Jaynagar railway station
 Howrah Junction railway station
 Howrah–Rajgir Fast Passenger

Notes

References

External links 

 53041/Howrah–Jaynagar Fast Passenger
 53042/Jaynagar–Howrah Fast Passenger

Rail transport in Howrah
Transport in Jainagar
Rail transport in West Bengal
Rail transport in Jharkhand
Rail transport in Bihar
Slow and fast passenger trains in India